EaDo/Stadium is a light rail station in Houston, Texas on the METRORail system. It is served by the Green and Purple lines. The station is named for the East Downtown Houston (EaDo) neighborhood as well as PNC Stadium, which the station serves. PNC Stadium is home to the Houston Dynamo of Major League Soccer and Houston Dash of the National Women's Soccer League.

EaDo/Stadium station opened on May 23, 2015, as part of the first phase of the Green Line.

References

METRORail stations
Railway stations in the United States opened in 2015
2015 establishments in Texas
Railway stations in Harris County, Texas